John Sudam, sometimes stylized Suydam, (March 23, 1782 – April 13, 1835 Albany, New York) was an American politician from New York.

Life
He married Ann Tallmadge (1775–1809), a sister of James Tallmadge, Jr. and Matthias B. Tallmadge. He then married Mary Harrison Elmendorf (1795–1855), and they had several children.

He was a member of the New York State Senate (2nd D.) from 1823 to 1824, sitting in the 46th and 47th New York State Legislatures.

He was a Regent of the University of the State of New York from 1829 until his death.

He was again a member of the State Senate (2nd D.) from 1833 until his death, sitting in the 56th, 57th and 58th New York State Legislatures.

He was buried at the Sharp Burying Ground in Kingston, New York.

References

Sources
The New York Civil List compiled by Franklin Benjamin Hough (pages 125, 129f, 146 and 338; Weed, Parsons and Co., 1858)

External links

1782 births
1835 deaths
Politicians from Kingston, New York
Regents of the University of the State of New York
New York (state) state senators
New York (state) Jacksonians
19th-century American politicians